Bruno José Palminha Saraiva (born 1 October 1974) is a Portuguese former footballer who played as a central defender, currently the manager of Louletano.

Playing career
Born in Huambo, Angola to Portuguese parents, Saraiva competed almost exclusively in the Portuguese third division in a ten-year senior career. He started out at S.C. Olhanense, retiring at the age of 29 after a spell with C.D. Olivais e Moscavide.

Saraiva's professional input consisted of the 2000–01 season, starting in 21 of his appearances for F.C. Marco and suffering relegation from the Segunda Liga.

Coaching career
After retiring, Saraiva spent his first years as a manager in youth football. On 1 May 2013, after Olhanense's Manuel Cajuda resigned a few weeks before the end of the 2012–13 campaign, he took on the role of interim at the Primeira Liga club with the primary goal of avoiding relegation. After a 0–0 home draw against C.S. Marítimo this was achieved, and he initially committed to a new deal only to leave the club shortly after and be replaced by former Portugal international Abel Xavier.

On 7 February 2017, after three incomplete spells in the third tier, Saraiva returned to Olhanense who ranked last in division two, eventually not being able to move the team from that place.

References

External links

1974 births
Living people
People from Huambo
Angolan people of Portuguese descent
Portuguese footballers
Association football defenders
Liga Portugal 2 players
Segunda Divisão players
S.C. Olhanense players
Atlético Clube de Portugal players
Amora F.C. players
F.C. Marco players
F.C. Barreirense players
C.D. Olivais e Moscavide players
Portuguese expatriate footballers
Expatriate footballers in Switzerland
Portuguese expatriate sportspeople in Switzerland
Portuguese football managers
Primeira Liga managers
Liga Portugal 2 managers
S.C. Olhanense managers
C.D. Fátima managers
S.R. Almancilense managers